James Vincent McNichol III (born July 2, 1961), known professionally as Jimmy McNichol, is an American actor and singer who first gained fame as a teen idol in the late 1970s. At the beginning of his career his popularity quickly grew, causing networks like CBS to create and implement multiple television series specifically for his involvement and leading roles. After making a record number of appearances on top talk shows he was viewed by many as "the face you see everywhere." 

In 1978, McNichol recorded an album with his sister, Kristy, also a child actress, and the two went on to host a youth-oriented variety show for ABC. McNichol subsequently had lead roles in Smokey Bites the Dust (1981), and opposite Susan Tyrrell in the horror film Butcher, Baker, Nightmare Maker (1981). After retiring from acting in the 1990s, McNichol relocated with his family to Colorado, and has been active in environmentalist causes, and working as a real estate investor and home renovator.

Biography

1961–1966: Early life
James Vincent McNichol III was born July 2, 1961 in Los Angeles, California, to James and Carolyn McNichol. He is of Lebanese and Irish descent. McNichol is the oldest of three siblings, with a sister Kristy (b. 1962) and brother Tommy (b. 1965). McNichol was raised by his single mother after the children's father, a carpenter, abandoned the family shortly after Tommy's birth. Their mother worked various odd jobs to support them, including as a secretary, cosmetics salesperson, and movie extra. Tommy was raised separately from him and Kristy, by his grandparents in Burbank.

1967–1991: Acting and music career

He began his career at age 7, acting in a Band-Aid commercial. He appeared in roughly 80 commercials from 1967–1973, including spots for Kool-Aid and Crest. He landed minor roles on shows such as Little House on the Prairie (1974) and S.W.A.T. (1975).

His first film appearance was an uncredited role in Sunshine (1973) at the age of 12. His first regular starring role was as younger brother Jack on the network series The Fitzpatricks. Michele Tobin played his sister, Mo, on the show, and they later worked together on California Fever. McNichol sang the show's theme song and in 1978 recorded an album with his sister, Kristy and Jimmy McNichol, produced by Phil & Mitch Margo. The album spawned one hit single, a cover of The Chiffons' "He's So Fine", which charted at #70 on the Billboard Hot 100 in August 1978. The siblings also appeared as co-hosts of the fall 1978 ABC All-Star Saturday Preview Special, a youth-oriented sketch comedy show featuring musical guests such as the Bee Gees and Donny Osmond. McNichol and his sister, however, ceased performing together after Kristy had a manic breakdown while the two were in France; she was diagnosed with bipolar disorder. Afterward, McNichol stepped away from the music industry, later commenting: "I know the outcomeit's a real big high one year, and the next year, nobody knows who you are. All that singing and touring and the guys behind you doing drugs. Eventually it's gonna get to you."

When California Fever ended, he won the role as host of a weekly talk show, Hollywood Teen, as well as the Jimmy McNichol Special, which first aired in April 1980. He also starred in the television film Champions: A Love Story (1979), a teen drama about an ex-hockey player and figure skater who fall in love. He subsequently appeared in several other successful made-for-TV movies, including the thriller Blinded by the Light (1980), in which he starred opposite his sister Kristy as a gay teenager who escapes a religious cult. He also made several low-budget feature films, including Smokey Bites the Dust (1981) and the horror film Butcher, Baker, Nightmare Maker (1982), co-starring with Susan Tyrrell and Bill Paxton.

In 1984, McNichol accepted the role of Josh Clayton on General Hospital. He performed in a band throughout the 1980s under the name "Jimmy James". His last major acting role was as Jill Ireland's son Valentine McCallum in the 1991 television film Reason for Living, co-starring Jill Clayburgh. After completing Reason for Living, at age 30, McNichol decided to retire from professional acting.

1992–present: Post-acting career
McNichol married his wife, Renée, in 1997. They had a son, Nash, in late 1997, and a daughter, Ellis, in late 1998. McNichol is an avid environmentalist and in 1998 was focusing on ecological education with a web site called ECOTV. Since leaving acting, McNichol began a career in residential construction and home rehabilitation. He also collaborated with Playground Television and Pet Power Kids on Animal Rescue The Rockies (or "ARTR"), a TV series documenting animal rescue and related issues.

In 2006, McNichol and his family relocated from Santa Barbara, California to Durango, Colorado, where he still resided as of 2016. In 2010, he discovered he had a third child: daughter Kellee Maize, a rap artist, songwriter, and entrepreneur from Pittsburgh who had been raised by adoptive parents in Pennsylvania. Their new familial bond was profiled in 2014 by Oprah Winfrey.

Filmography

Film

Television

Discography
Kristy and Jimmy McNichol (RCA, 1978)

References

Sources

External links

 
 

1961 births
Living people
Male actors from California
American environmentalists
American male pop singers
American male child actors
American male television actors
American people of Irish descent
American people of Lebanese descent
Male actors from Los Angeles